The name Olaf has been used for six tropical cyclones in the Eastern Pacific.

The name is used on the modern six-year lists:
 Hurricane Olaf (1985), never threatened land.
 Tropical Storm Olaf (1997), made landfall twice.
 Hurricane Olaf (2003), made landfall in Mexico as a tropical storm.
 Tropical Storm Olaf (2009), approached Baja California.
 Hurricane Olaf (2015), moved into the Central Pacific and then back into the Eastern Pacific while still tropical.
 Hurricane Olaf (2021), made landfall in Baja California.

The name Olaf was also used for one tropical cyclone in the Southwest Pacific:
 Cyclone Olaf, a 2005 Category 5 cyclone that affected Samoa.

Pacific hurricane set index articles
South Pacific cyclone set index articles